Diplecogaster bimaculata, the two-spotted clingfish, is a species of fish in the family Gobiesocidae found in Black Sea, Mediterranean Sea and Atlantic Ocean where it is found on rocks and among seagrass or shell beds.

Description

The species has pelvic fins modified to create a sucker which is used for clinging to rocks or other hard surfaces. It shows variable colouration and its body is frequently coloured red and is spotted with violet, blue, brown or yellow, and they have a yellowish ventral surface. They are sexually dimorphic and the males show a purple spot, surrounded by yellow, immediately to the rear of their pectoral fin. It has a flattened body and a small head, which is roughly triangular in shape. The single dorsal and anal fin are situated posteriorly near to the tail and both are separate from the caudal fin which sits at the end of a long caudal peduncle. It has large eyes and a short snout which ends in large, fleshy lips and very small gill openings. D. bimaculata can be confused with the similar Apletodon dentatus, although the two-spotted clingfish extends much further north than the small-headed clingfish, and the best way to distinguish them is from their teeth, which in this species are small and conical and grow in patches and there are no large canine teeth.

Distribution
Diplecogaster bimaculata is found in the northeastern Atlantic from Trøndelag in Norway and the Faroes south to Gibraltar; its range includes Madeira, the Azores and the Canary Islands, as well as the Mediterranean Sea as far east as the Adriatic Sea.

Habitat and biology
Most commonly found in areas of rocky substrates, D. bimaculata is also frequently spotted in beds of seagrasses and bivalve banks, where there is an abundance of empty mollusc shells for the fish to shelter in. The eggs are laid in the spring and summer with the parents guarding the egg mass, which is normally laid under a stone or in an empty shell. The larvae and the juvenile fish are pelagic but quickly move to a benthic habit. The major part of its diet is small crustaceans. It has been photographed cleaning a Mediterranean moray (Muraena helena).

Name
It was described as Cyclopterus bimaculatus in 1788 by Pierre Joseph Bonnaterre and was designated as the type species of the genus Diplecogaster by Alec Fraser-Brunner in 1938. The specific name bimaculata refers to the two dark spots on either side of the adhesive sucker while the generic name is a compound of di meaning "two", pleco meaning "fold" and gaster meaning belly, a reference to the double-type sucker of this genus.

See also 

 List of fish of Ireland
 List of fish in Sweden
 List of British Isles rockpool life
 List of fish in Ukraine
 List of fish of the Black Sea
 List of fish of the Mediterranean Sea

References 

bimaculata
Marine fish of Europe
Fish of the Atlantic Ocean
Fish of the Mediterranean Sea
Fish described in 1788
Taxa named by Pierre Joseph Bonnaterre